North Valley may refer to:

North Valley (San Jose), California
North Valley, New Mexico